John Jordan (died ) was an English politician.

He was a Member (MP) of the Parliament of England for Dorchester from 1397 to 1414.

References

English MPs January 1397
English MPs September 1397
Members of the Parliament of England for Dorchester
English MPs 1402
English MPs January 1404
English MPs 1406
English MPs 1407
English MPs 1410
English MPs November 1414